Ouachita City (also Ouachita or Washita) is an unincorporated community in Union Parish, Louisiana, United States.

Notable people
United States District Court Judge Benjamin C. Dawkins Sr. (1881–1966) was born in Ouachita City.

Notes

Unincorporated communities in Union Parish, Louisiana
Unincorporated communities in Louisiana